Howard D. King (June 4, 1932 - May 4, 2016) was the public-address announcer of Michigan Stadium (the home stadium of the Michigan Wolverines college football team) for 33 years,
from 1972
to 2005.  King and his wife, Liz Sayre-King, resided in Traverse City, Michigan, USA.

King died at his home on May 4, 2016, aged 83.

References

1932 births
2016 deaths
American sports announcers
Public address announcers
United States Marines